Frans Vilho Mustasilta (27 September 1879 - 29 May 1949) was a Finnish smallholder and politician, born in Lavia. He was a member of the Parliament of Finland from 1913 to 1916, from 1924 to 1927 and from 1933 to 1945, representing the Social Democratic Party of Finland (SDP).

References

1879 births
1949 deaths
People from Lavia, Finland
People from Turku and Pori Province (Grand Duchy of Finland)
Social Democratic Party of Finland politicians
Members of the Parliament of Finland (1913–16)
Members of the Parliament of Finland (1924–27)
Members of the Parliament of Finland (1933–36)
Members of the Parliament of Finland (1936–39)
Members of the Parliament of Finland (1939–45)
Finnish people of World War II